Paddington Jones (1766 – 22 August 1833) was a British bare-knuckle boxer from 1785 to 1805 who also worked extensively as a second (i.e cornerman).<ref>Pierce Egan, ''Boxiana, or Sketches of Ancient and Modern Pugilism, volume 1, 1830, pages 228-239</ref>

Early life
Jones was born in Paddington, London 'about the year 1766',Boxiana volume 1, page 228 from whence came his ringname, Tom 'Paddington' Jones. 

In his early boxing career he came under the eye of boxer Tom Johnson, who recognized his early talent and helped develop his boxing skills.

Throughout his boxing career, Jones acted as Master of Ceremonies at London's Fives and Tennis Courts, frequent boxing exhibition venues, where he hosted and helped plan the bills.  

Bare-knuckle boxing career
In a period before the introduction of formal weight-based categories Jones was informally considered a lightweight (although in modern parlance would be considered a welterweight, a designation which did not exist at the time Jones fought). He was tall for his weight, with a hard, slim appearance, and had a narrow face with a long aquiline nose.  He is credited with having fought more bouts and seconded more pugilists than any boxer of his day. He fought several notable bare-knuckle boxers of his day, including Caleb Baldwin, and Jem Belcher. 

Boxing highlights 1785-86
The noted early boxing Pierce Egan notes that the early 'trifling skirmishes of [Tom Jones] are too numerous to be noted'. Jones' first significant fight (i.e fought for stakes) was against Ned Holmes in 1785, at Paddington Fields, for a mere half a crown, which Jones lost.  Jones was but an inexperienced youth, and Holmes a full grown man, and Jones could not pull out a victory. 

He fought three battles against the one-eyed Sailor in February 1786 for 10, 5, and 7 guineas at London's Hyde Park. 

Jones fought Ned Holmes for a second time on 19 December 1786 for stakes of a guinea and a half. This time Jones Jones vanquished the older man in an easy victory.

Boxing highlights 1787-92
Sometime in 1786 or 1787, Jones fought a boxer named Aldridge, for a stakes of 2 guineas on one side against a watch on the other.  Aldridge was a Life-guardsman, a member of the British army who traditionally guarded the Monarch. Showing greater stamina than his opponent, Jones won the 60 round match at Marylebone, on 19 December 1787. Aldridge had bragged of his skills at Tom Johnson's house, and had the boxer Joe Ward match him with Paddington.  Ward acted as second, and some of the best boxing talent in London witnessed the intrepid Jones pull off a victory that brought him considerable attention in boxing circles.

Match with Caleb Baldwin

On 14 May 1792 he fought Caleb Baldwin for a purse of £20 at Smitham Bottom (a remote location about 13 miles south of London in the area now known as Coulsdon on the outskirts of Greater London). The battle was fought on the same constructed stage on which the great Daniel Mendoza had earlier fought Bill Warr for the English Championship. After the Jones-Baldwin fight ended after 30 minutes a dispute arose as Baldwin believed he had won the match, but the onlookers believed it was correctly to be considered a draw. 

Boxing highlights 1794-1799
Jones fought the Jewish boxer Keely Lyons on 10 May 1794 at Blackheath, for 20 guineas. Former champion Tom Johnson served as Jones' second. The contemporary report states that 'it was a well-contested battle, in which much science and bottom were displayed on both sides; but in the event Jones proved the conqueror'. The two boxers fought again on 22 June 1795 at Hounslow. On this occasion Jones won again, in 9 rounds, 16 minutes.Pugilistica volume 1, p117

In August 1795 Jones fought Harris the Spaniard in a match at Lansdowne, Bristol on 12 August 1795. After 20 minutes, Harris bolted with the purse, ending the fight and 'leaving Jones and Co, lamenting'.

Bout against Jem Belcher, 1799

On 12 April 1799, Jones lost to the future English champion Jem Belcher in seventeen rounds (lasting thirty-three minutes). The fight was for a purse of £50 and was held at Old Oak Common Wormwood Scrubbs, then some distance west of London. Jones had as his seconds Joe Ward and Dick Hall. It was Belcher's first fight in a London ring.  Belcher was only 19 and Jones was a more experienced 30. However, Belcher outweighed Jones by about 2 stone (174lb vs 145lb).Boxiana volume 1, p236 The contemporary report of the fight in Boxiana reads as follows:

[In] the first round considerable science was displayed on both sides - the experience and skill of Jones were well portrayed: and the dexterity and new mode of fighting, so exclusively Belcher's own, was soon exhibited, but on the termination of the round Belcher was knocked down. The advantages in the second and third round were perfectly reciprocal; but in the fourth and fifth Jones was levelled. In the sixth and seventh rounds Jones showed off in most excellent style - and the amateurs [i.e. spectators] experienced some of the finest displays of the art. [...] It was a clean fight throughout [...] and it might be deemed a model for pugilists in general to follow. [...] The eight and ninth were spiritedly contested, but in the tenth round Belcher put in some tremendous hits, with the rapidity of lightning. This immediately altered the appearance of things [...] Yet Jones nobly contested for victory for the space of thirty-three minutes before he gave in.    

Later career, 1801-1805

On 31 July 1801, Jones fought Isaac Bitton, a Jewish boxer, at Wimbledon Common for 20 guineas a side. The contemporary source Pancratia (which described Bitton as 'Elias', a reference to his Jewish heritage) records that 'For the first 20 minutes Tom evidently had the advantage, and during this time great sport had been afforded to the amateurs [i.e spectators] by the excellent science that was displayed; Elias, however, put in a hit so forcibly behind Tom's ear that he immediately fell, and gave up the contest'. Bitton was apparently a much larger man than Jones.Boxiana volume 1, p237 Jem Belcher, by this time English champion, served as Jones' second in this bout. 

In March 1802 Jones fought George Nicholls for stakes of 20 guineas a side at Norwood (currently in South London, but at the time a rather remote rural location). Nicholls had previously refused to fight Jones in 1798, stating that Jones was too tall. Boxiana records the 1802 encounter as follows:

Three rounds were well contested, and considerable science was displayed, but in the fourth Nicholls ran furiously in, and getting his head between Jones's legs, and catching fast hold of both his ankles, threw Tom with considerable violence - this was deemed an infringement upon the articles and completely deviated from the rules of pugilism

This resulted in a protracted argument between the fighters' backers and seconds on who had won the fight and entitled to claim the stakes. As no agreement could be reached, the result would seem to have been a draw. In 1805 Nicholls would go on to be the only man to defeat Tom Cribb (English Champion from 1808-1821). 

Jones fought Simpson for 10 guineas a side, in a well-fought fight lasting 10 rounds, at Edgware Road, near London in June 1804.  Simpson had been a pupil of Jones's mentor Tom Johnson.

The last reported fight of Tom Jones took at Blackheath on August 6th 1805, against 'Lyons the Yokel Jew' (not the same as the Keely Lyons that Jones had fought earlier in his career). Pugilistica reports that 'This was one of the most terrible conflicts in which Tom had been engaged. Yokel was a desperate punisher, and Jones suffered severely in the fight, nevertheless Yokel gave in'.

Late career as boxing attendant
Puglistica noted that 'No man appeared oftener in the character of a second than Tom Jones, and few understood that duty better than himself'. Among a few of the important matches in which he acted as second he attended the black boxer Tom Molineaux in his second battle with Tom Cribb, Burke in his 1804 fight against Hen Pearce, and Peter Crawley in his 1819 encounter with Tom Hickman. He also acted regularly as second for the foremost lightweight boxer of the early 19th century Jack Randall. 

Benefit for Jones
On 16 April 1818, a benefit was held for Jones at London's Fifth-Street, Soho. Boxers who sparred at Paddington's well attended benefit included Tom Oliver, Tom Spring, Big Ben Burns, and Jack Scroggins.

Jones' style of boxing
The contemporary source Boxiana described Jones as follows:

As a pugilist [he] is entitled to the most honourable mention, in being perfectly master of the science, and with bottom [i.e. courage] of the first quality. He has turned out several good pupils. His guard is formidable and commanding, and his left arm firm and extended to protect his body from assault, while his right is on the alert to give the return instantly. Tom is a very hard hitter, can use his hands with equal facility, stands well upon his legs, and meets his man with fortitude; his positions are not only elegant, but calculated to do much execution in putting in his blows.

Death
'Jones died at his birthplace, Paddington, August 22 1833, at the age of 67'.

Paddington Tom Jones' career record
We do not have full details for Jones' career. The following table has been drawn up primarily from information on the list included in Fistiana (1841) page 193, the most complete source available, supplemented by additional data from Boxiana (1830) and Pugilisitica (1906). Sources are sometimes contradictory, so some details show two different possibilities.  

|-
| align="center" colspan=8|16 Wins, 3 Losses, 3 Draws|-
| align="center" style="border-style: none none solid solid; background: #e3e3e3"|Result| align="center" style="border-style: none none solid solid; background: #e3e3e3"|Opponent| align="center" style="border-style: none none solid solid; background: #e3e3e3"|Date| align="center" style="border-style: none none solid solid; background: #e3e3e3"|Location| align="center" style="border-style: none none solid solid; background: #e3e3e3"|Duration| align="center" style="border-style: none none solid solid; background: #e3e3e3"|Stakes/Purse'''
|- 
|Loss
| Ned Holmes
| 1785
| Paddington Fields, London
| Unknown
| Half a crown
|-
| Win
| George Stringer
| 1785 or 1786?
| Paddington Fields
| Unknown
| 5 guineas a side  
|-
|Win
| Jem Smith
| 1785 or 1786?
| Lissom Green, Paddington
| Unknown
| 12 guineas
|-
| Win
| One-eyed Sailor
| Feb 1786
| Hyde Park, London
| Unknown
| First fight, 10 guineas
|-
| Win
| One-eyed Sailor
| Feb 1786
| Hyde Park, London?
| Unknown
| Second fight, either 10 or 7 guineas
|-
| Win
| One-eyed Sailor
| Feb 1786
| Hyde Park, London?
| Unknown
| Third fight, 5 guineas
|-
| Win
| Ned Holmes
| 19th Dec 1786
| Harley Fields, nr Portland Place 
| Unknown
| a guinea and a half
|-
| Win
| Jack Aldridge, the Lifeguardsman
| 19 Dec 1787
| Paddington Fields, Marylebone Fields or Harley Fields 
| 60 rounds (or 15 minutes, sources differ) 
| Fought for 2 guineas vs a watch (or 6 guineas a side, sources differ)
|-
| Win
| Jack Blackwell
| 1788?
| Harley Fields
| Unknown
| 10 shillings
|-
| Win
| Tom Burley
| 1788?
| Harley Fields
| Unknown
| 10 shillings
|-
| style="background: #dae2f1"|*Draw*
| Caleb Baldwin*
| 14th May 1792
| Smitham Bottom, Coulsdon
| 30 mins
| Purse of £20  
|-
| Win
| Dick Horton
| soon after 14th May 1792
| The Ring, Hyde Park 
| Unknown
| 20 guineas
|-
| Win
| Abraham Challice
| 5th Sept 1792
| Bentley Green, Colchester
| 15 mins
| Subscription purse of 30 guineas
|-
| Win
| Keeley Lyons
| 10 May 1794
| Blackheath
| 10 mins
| 20 guineas
|-
| Win
| Keeley Lyons
| 22 June 1795
| Hounslow
| 9 rounds, 16 minutes
| 10 guineas
|-
|style="background: #dae2f1"|*Draw*
| Spaniard Harris
| 12 Aug 1795
| Lansdown Bristol
| 20 minutes
| Harris ran off with the purse
|-
| Win
| The Chaffcutter
| 6th Apr 1797
| Two Waters, Herts
| 22 rounds, 38 mins
| 4 guineas
|-
| Loss
| Jem Belcher*
| 12 Apr 1799
| Old Oak Common, Wormwood Scrubs
| 17 rounds, 33 mins
| 25 guineas a side 
|- 
| Loss
| Isaac Bitton
| 31 July 1801
| Wimbledon Common
| 4 rounds
| Lost purse of 40 guineas
|-
| style="background: #dae2f1"|*Draw*
| George Nicholls
| March 1802
| Norwood Common
| 4 rounds, ended in dispute
| 20 guineas a side
|-
| Win
| Simpson
| June 1804
| Putney Green or Edgware Road 
| 10 rounds
| 10 guineas a side
|-
| Win
| Lyons the Yokel Jew
| Aug 6th 1805
| Hounslow or Blackheath
| Unknown
| 10 guineas a side
|-

Honors
Jones was elected to the International Boxing Hall of Fame in 2010.

References

External links

Paddington Jones' career record, as given in the 1841 source Fistiana, or The Oracle of the Ring, page 193.
Chapter on Paddington Jones in Boxiana, or Sketches of Ancient and Modern Pugilism volume 1, 1830, Pierce Egan
Chapter on Paddington Jones in Pugilistica, the History of British Boxing volume 1, 1906, Henry Downes Miles  

Famous Fights Past and Present Online Archive (Search for Paddington Jones)

1766 births
1833 deaths
Bare-knuckle boxers
International Boxing Hall of Fame inductees
English male boxers